These are the list of results that England have played from 1930 to 1939.

1930 
Scores and results list England's points tally first.

1931 
Scores and results list England's points tally first.

1932 
Scores and results list England's points tally first.

1933 
Scores and results list England's points tally first.

1934 
Scores and results list England's points tally first.

1935 
Scores and results list England's points tally first.

1936 
Scores and results list England's points tally first.

1937 
Scores and results list England's points tally first.

1938 
Scores and results list England's points tally first.

1939 
Scores and results list England's points tally first.

Year Box 

1930–39
1929–30 in English rugby union
1930–31 in English rugby union
1931–32 in English rugby union
1932–33 in English rugby union
1933–34 in English rugby union
1934–35 in English rugby union
1935–36 in English rugby union
1936–37 in English rugby union
1937–38 in English rugby union
1938–39 in English rugby union